Neufahrn i. NB or Neufahrn in Niederbayern is a municipality in the district of Landshut in Bavaria in Germany. Its Bavarian name is Neifing.

Neufahrn is located on the Kleine Laber, a river which flows into the Große Laber and then into the Danube.

Main sights
Castle of Neufahrn (14th century)
Church of St. Laurentius (Neobaroque building 1907/1908, old tower 13th century)

Sons and daughters of Neufahrn
 Hans Meyer (* 1884; † 1966), Philosopher

References

Landshut (district)